Gabriel Stulman is the CEO and founder of Happy Cooling Hospitality.  Their New York City restaurants include Fairfax, Jolene, Jeffrey’s Grocery and Joseph Leonard.  In 2022, he opened his first restaurant outside of manhattan in Fort Greene, Brooklyn — Txikito.

Biography
Raised in a Jewish family in Fairfax, Virginia, Stulman is a 2003 graduate of the University of Wisconsin–Madison with a double major in history named political science. He started college with the intention of becoming a history teacher, working as a bartender and at restaurants.

He moved to NYC after graduating and two years later, opened little Owl.  Stulman opened Market Table soon after.

He and his wife Gina, who helps him run Happy Cooking, have a son Simon.

Awards and honors
Esquire named him Restaurateur of the Year in 2012.  The year before, Crain's New York included him in their 40 under 40 list.

References

American chief executives of food industry companies
American restaurateurs
Living people
University of Wisconsin–Madison College of Letters and Science alumni
People from Fairfax, Virginia
Year of birth missing (living people)